Alan Pultz (July 7, 1937 – October 25, 2001) was an award-winning American television director whose work was confined to the small screen. For many years he directed episodes of General Hospital.

Background 
Born in New York, he attended the University of North Carolina. He was also in the U.S. Navy and achieved the rank of lieutenant. While in the navy, he was part of the team that recovered Alan Shepard who was the first astronaut in space.

Career
Early in his career he was a theater manager, and progressed to production assistant and associate director. Some of the programs he worked on were The Jimmy Dean Show and Who Do You Trust?. As a director, his early work included A Time for Us and One Life to Live. Working with producer, Gloria Monty he directed episodes of ABC Daytime's General Hospital for twenty two years. Other directorial works include Return To Peyton Place and The Best of Everything. He worked on Dark Shadows as an associate director,

In 1967, he worked on Dark Shadows as an assistant director. The three episodes he worked on aired from April to August.  In 1993, both Pultz and William Ludel received the Daytime Drama award for their work on General Hospital.

Death
Pultz died in his sleep on October 25, 2001, at his home in Encino, California. He was buried in Lebanon, Connecticut. He was survived by Doris, his wife and a brother and sister.

Awards & Nominations 

 Pultz was nominated for 8 Daytime Emmy Awards (his first nomination was shared with Marlene Laird/Marlene Laird and Phil Sogard) and won 3 times.
 He won a Directors Guild of America Award in 1996 for Outstanding Directorial Achievement in Serials - Daytime.

References

Other
 Los Angeles Times, November 14, 2001 - Obituaries, Alan L. Pultz, 64; Director of ABC's 'General Hospital' 
 Variety, November 6, 2001 - Alan Pultz
 We Love Soaps, Wednesday, January 9, 2013 - NOMINEES: Directors Guild of America Awards
 The Free Library - MEMORIAL SERVICE SET FOR TV DIRECTOR PULTZ.

External links

1937 births
2001 deaths
American television directors
Directors Guild of America Award winners
United States Navy officers
Daytime Emmy Award winners
University of North Carolina alumni